The Stanislaus Regional Transit Authority, branded as The S, is a public transportation bus system serving Modesto, California and surrounding Stanislaus County. It was formed in 2021 from the merger of the Modesto Area Express (MAX) and Stanislaus Regional Transit (StaRT) systems. Most routes connect at the downtown Modesto Transportation Center; the Vintage Faire Mall serves as a secondary hub.

History

Modesto intracity service
Originally, passengers in Modesto were served by streetcars over the short-line Modesto Interurban Railway from 1911 to 1917, operated intermittently first by the Tidewater Southern Railway; the Modesto and Empire Traction Company was founded on October 7, 1911, and began regularly scheduled passenger service between Modesto and Empire on November 1 of that year. Passenger service was discontinued in 1917 after freight became more important.

Public bus transportation service in Modesto started on September 19, 1927, when the City Transit Company (CTC), a private venture, began operations under a city franchise. CTC ran a single bus on a 30-minute schedule, but soon added two more buses to expand service throughout Modesto.

City Transit told the City Council they would renew its liability insurance in June 1932 as a condition to keep the franchise; however, struggling with profitability, the franchise was transferred to a new owner three months later in September 1932. The privately owned Modesto Motor Bus Service (MBS) took over and ran transit operations in Modesto through 1973, serving a peak of one million riders in 1945 due to wartime shortages of gasoline and automobiles. The 1955 map of four routes resembled a cloverleaf in shape; that year, MBS petitioned the California Public Utilities Commission to raise fares from 15 to 20 cents, with losses projected to be  that year.

By 1968, the unreliability of the aging MBS fleet led the city to purchase four new GM "old-look" transit buses, which were then leased to MBS to improve its financial health. At the time, MBS was owned and operated by Willis M. Kleinenbroich, who was responsible for maintaining, driving, and dispatching the buses. By 1973, with the service continuing to lose money, Kleinenbroich attempted to sell the company but found no private buyers; instead, it was acquired by the city of Modesto in 1973 and renamed to Intracity Transit. The city would continue to purchase several GM New Look buses in 1973 and 1976.  Modesto subsequently rebranded it as Modesto Area Express in 1990.

As the New Look fleet aged, Modesto replaced them with mid-size Rapid Transit Series (1980), Gillig Phantom, and Gillig Low Floor buses; for the longer suburban/commuter express routes, Modesto has used MCI D-Series highway coaches.

Stanislaus County intercity services
Stanislaus Regional Transit was a division of the Stanislaus County Department of Public Works, which operated fixed intercity routes, mainly within the county; one route connected to neighboring Merced County.

Merger
A 2019 Transit Efficiency and Innovations Study recommended the merger of MAX and StaRT and on January 26, 2021, the Modesto City Council and the Stanislaus County Board of Supervisors each approved the merger, forming the new Stanislaus Regional Transit Authority.

Routes

References

External links

San Joaquin Valley
Transportation in Modesto, California
Bus transportation in California
Public transportation in the San Francisco Bay Area
Public transportation in Stanislaus County, California
Transit agencies in California